Grand Forks International Airport  is a public airport five miles (8 km) northwest of Grand Forks, in Grand Forks County, North Dakota, United States. GFK has no scheduled passenger flights out of the country but has an "international" title (like many other airports) because it has customs service for arrivals from Canada and other countries.

The airport, sometimes called Mark Andrews International Airport after Mark Andrews, a former U.S. House Representative and U.S. Senator from North Dakota, is owned by the Grand Forks Regional Airport Authority and located on U.S. Highway 2, around four miles (6 km) west of Interstate 29, within city limits in a detached section of the city that is surrounded by Rye Township.

In 2009 the airport's FAA control tower was the 23rd-busiest in the nation, with 346,165 tower operations. About 90% of all operations at GFK are flights operated by the University of North Dakota's John D. Odegard School of Aerospace Sciences, which is based on the field.

It is included in the Federal Aviation Administration (FAA) National Plan of Integrated Airport Systems for 2017–2021, in which it is categorized as a non-hub primary commercial service facility.

Governance
GFK is a non-hub, primary commercial service airport.

The Grand Forks Regional Airport Authority is a public, non-profit organization established as a joint partnership between Grand Forks County and the City of Grand Forks. This is the governance of the airport. The Airport Authority consists of a seven-member Board of Commissioners appointed by the Grand Forks Mayor, Brandon Bochenski, and the Grand Forks County Commission. Dane Simonson is the Chair of the Board followed by Cynthia Pic, Vice Chair. Other members of the board include Karl Bollingberg, Tim Mutchler, Rick Meland, Steve Kuhlman, and Kyle Kvamme. The Airport Authority staff consists of Ryan Riesinger, Executive Director, Krista Martin, Director of Finance/Administration, Katie Olson, Administrative Assistant, and Joey Castiglione, Director of Operations and Maintenance (Grand Forks International Airport, 2023).

Infrastructure

Terminal
The now closed original passenger terminal at GFK was built in 1964. Outside terminal security were the Delta and Allegiant Airlines ticketing counters, a restaurant, a gift shop and a waiting area. After passing through security screening there is a small waiting area that served the terminal's two passenger gates.

In the mid-2000s, discussion began of upgrading or totally replacing the terminal as it has structural and safety problems and leaves little to no room for expansion. Findings from a study commissioned by the Grand Forks Regional Airport Authority were released in early 2005. The study, which was done by Ulteig Engineers, gave the Airport Authority options for the future of the passenger terminal.

One option was to keep the terminal as is. The consulting group did not recommend this as the terminal has too many structural and safety problems. The list of problems include: mold growth, roof leakage, differential settlement, blocking runway line of sight, passenger boarding, potential equipment damage from basement flooding, outdated electrical and mechanical systems, no sprinkler system, code deficiencies, insufficient parking setback, and interior traffic circulation issues. The terminal could be rehabilitated for $18.3 million, but that would leave many issues unresolved and leave no room for expansion.

The consulting group recommended that a brand new passenger terminal would the best solution to the current terminal's problems. Five locations for a new terminal were evaluated favoring a site between the cargo apron and general aviation apron. Ground was broken on the new terminal in July 2009, with completion expected by 2011. The building was named the Byron L Dorgan Terminal, in honor of retired North Dakota Senator Byron Dorgan. It was opened and dedicated on August 30, 2011.

The new passenger terminal, designed by JLG Architects, is a two-story building, with Delta and Allegiant ticketing counters, baggage claim carousel, and several rental car agencies. The first floor has an inline checked baggage screening system. The Grand Forks Regional Airport Authority has several offices on the second floor, along with the TSA security checkpoint. Beyond security is a waiting area for both of the airport's gates. Red River Valley Grill also serves both the public and secured side of the airport for concessions and beverages. There is also a small gift shop in the grill.

UND Aerospace
GFK's largest tenant is not an airline, but the University of North Dakota's John D. Odegard Aerospace Program.  The university utilizes 11 heated hangars to house approximately 120 aircraft. A flight operations building that is the headquarters for dispatching aircraft, pre-briefing students for flights, and an on-site cafeteria on the top level of the five-story building. GFK also houses UND's Unmanned Aerial Systems (UAS) training facility. The facility is used for ground briefings, flight simulators, and systems training for students who are pursuing a major focusing on unmanned aircraft. The most recent addition at GFK was a new hangar for UND's helicopter flight training operations completed December 2011.

Most operations (takeoff and landing) at GFK is from the University of North Dakota. The UND Aerospace Foundation occupies the northeastern (Bravo), and eastern (Charlie) ramps on the airport. UND operates a fleet over 120 aircraft including Cessna 172s, Cessna 150s, Piper Seminoles, Piper Archers, and several Beechcraft King Air 90s and a pair of American Champion Decathlons for flight training. Several buildings complement such a fleet of aircraft, including a dispatch center, a full-time maintenance center, and dedicated line support personal.

Runways

 Runway 9L/27R:  concrete
 Runway 17L/35R:  concrete
 Runway 17R/35L:  asphalt
 Runway 9R/27L:  concrete

Due to the increased amount of general aviation traffic, primarily from the UND Aerospace flight training school, a fourth runway has been completed on the southeast side of the airport. It is a parallel east–west runway named 9R/27L. The previous runway 8/26 was renamed in October 2008 to 9L/27R in preparation for the new runway. Plans in 2022 to extend 9L/27R.

Aircraft
In 2015 the airport had 298,525 aircraft operations, average 817 per day: 68% general aviation, 32% air taxi, 1% commercial, and <1% military. In April 2017, there were 92 aircraft based at this field: 67 single-engine, 14 multi-engine, 4 jet, and 7 helicopter.

FBO
Avflight Grand Forks, the fixed-base operator at the airport, completed construction of a new $4.5 million facility in autumn 2008. The previous facilities are now used by wing of the U.S. Customs and Border Protection, housing a number of government aircraft and helicopters. Valley Med Fight, an air ambulance company, also occupies near by hangars, which are managed by Avflight. The FBO also handles all ground operations for Allegiant.

Originally GFK Flight Support, the FBO and its facilities were purchased by the Saginaw, Michigan-based Avflight Corporation and re-branded as Avflight Grand Forks in 2015.

Airlines and destinations

Passenger

Allegiant Air uses Airbus A320-214s and Airbus A319-111s to Las Vegas, Phoenix, and Orlando. Delta Air Lines uses Boeing 717-200s to Minneapolis. Delta Connection uses Bombardier CRJ900s and Embraer E175s operated by SkyWest Airlines to Minneapolis.

Cargo
FedEx Express was the second-largest employer at KGFK. The FedEx ramp at KGFK served the entire state of North Dakota, northwestern Minnesota, and small portions of South Dakota and Montana. FedEx had over 100 employees—customer service representatives, ramp agents, couriers, semi-drivers and jet aircraft and vehicle maintenance workers. Ramp agents worked evening or early morning shifts, loading and unloading the aircraft, feeder planes and trucks. FedEx contracted with Corporate Air to provide pilots and maintenance for eleven feeder aircraft. Corporate Air was KGFK's tenth-largest employer.

On February 17, 2016, FedEx announced that it would be moving its operations from the Grand Forks Airport to Fargo's Hector International Airport. FedEx moved all flight operations to Fargo on October 31, 2016.

Statistics

Annual traffic

On November 9, 2010, GFK had 100,570 boardings, one more than the record achieved in 12 months in 1994. As of April 2014, passenger boardings at GFK had reached 147,000, a 7% increase year-over-year (April 2012 – April 2013).

During the same period, Delta led passenger traffic with 181,550 passengers (arriving and departing) and maintained a 59.64% market share. Allegiant trailed at 117,000 total passengers and a 39.98% market share. Scheduled departures have risen to 5,572, compared to 4,355 in 2010.

On October 3, 2012, United Airlines (operated by United Express) started flying between Denver and Grand Forks. Less than one year later, on September 10, 2013, United announced they would terminate service on December 3, 2013, citing low load factors.

Ground Transportation
As of 2022, there is no public transit service to Grand Forks International Airport. The closest Cities Area Transit bus stop is located over 3 miles away.

References

External links

 Avflight Grand Forks, the fixed-base operator (FBO)
 
 

Airfields of the United States Army Air Forces in North Dakota
Buildings and structures in Grand Forks County, North Dakota
Greater Grand Forks
Airports in North Dakota
Year of establishment missing